Iowa City Transit is an American public transit system serving Iowa City, Iowa. The service provides several routes serving various areas of the city as well as University Heights, originating and terminating at the Iowa City Downtown Interchange. In addition, a loop route is provided for school students at the beginning and end of each school day. In addition to Iowa City Transit, Coralville Transit and the University of Iowa Cambus also provide transit service in the Iowa City area, and Iowa City Transit shares several bus stops with them.

Routes 
Iowa City Transit operates 13 routes, all of which originate and terminate at the Iowa City Downtown Interchange except for route 3 (Eastside Loop). Prior to August 2, 2021, Iowa City Transit operated 26 unnumbered routes, and several of the current routes are identical to those in the previous system. Some routes are interlined, which means that once a bus completes its route and returns to the Downtown Interchange, it will change to a different route. All routes operate from Monday to Saturday, with reduced service on evenings and Saturdays. This is in contrast to the previous system, where only a select number of routes operated a modified route for evenings and Saturdays. There is no service on Sundays and holidays.

Route list

Bus tracking 
Real-time bus tracking is available through the Transit app, which provides estimated arrival times at a bus stop and precise locations of buses on the map. The other two transit systems in the Iowa City area, Coralville Transit and Cambus, also use the Transit app. Prior to 2019, bus tracking for the Iowa City area transit systems was provided by BONGO (Bus on the Go).

Future plans 
Several plans for the Iowa City area transit systems were considered over the past few years as part of a multi-year transit study. Changes considered include service on Sundays, as well as the elimination of fares.

In early 2021, Iowa City Transit made plans to introduce 4 Proterra ZX5 electric buses to the fleet, which will replace 4 existing diesel buses. A test bus operated briefly in the spring of 2021, and the 4 buses are expected to be delivered and enter revenue service in the fall of 2021.

Fleet

See also
List of intercity bus stops in Iowa

References

External links 
 Iowa City Transit official website

Bus transportation in Iowa
Iowa City, Iowa